In the mathematical field of graph theory, the Balaban 10-cage or Balaban -cage is a 3-regular graph with 70 vertices and 105 edges named after Alexandru T. Balaban. Published in 1972, It was the first 10-cage discovered but it is not unique.

The complete list of 10-cages and the proof of minimality was given by Mary R. O'Keefe and Pak Ken Wong. There exist 3 distinct -cages, the other two being the Harries graph and the Harries–Wong graph. Moreover, the Harries–Wong graph and Harries graph are cospectral graphs.

The Balaban 10-cage has chromatic number 2, chromatic index 3, diameter	6, girth 10 and is hamiltonian. It is also a 3-vertex-connected graph and 3-edge-connected. The book thickness is 3 and the queue number is 2.

The characteristic polynomial of the Balaban 10-cage is

Gallery

See also
Molecular graph
Balaban 11-cage

References 

Individual graphs
Regular graphs